Mars Mission was a Lego theme sold from 2007 to 2009. It is set on Mars and features astronauts, aliens, and high-tech machinery.

Plot 
In the year 2045, a highly upgraded version of the Spirit, a previous Martian rover, was sent to the Red Planet, where it discovered mysterious, radio-active crystals (called 'Biodium' in the story). A crewed mission followed, which discovered intelligent life.

Pre-Hive Synopsis (2007) 
Once arriving on the Red Planet, with vehicles designed for exploration and mining, the astronauts began mining the energy crystals abundant there. But soon, the crystals begin disappearing.
It does not take the astronauts long to find the source of the problem: aliens sneakily making raids on their crystals. However, once discovered, the aliens become more open – and dangerous – about their thefts. The Astros quickly convert their vehicles into a hi-tech defense military force, and
so, the war on Mars began. Later, the Astros at Eagle Command Base intercept a coded message from the aliens, saying they are not from Mars, but still intend to drive away the astronauts and claim the crystals for themselves.
It was a harsh struggle for a long while, with both sides on a stalemate, until one of the Astro machines, named the Crystal Reaper, accidentally stumbled across the cracks forming the surface of the Alien Hive on Olympus Mons.

Hive Synopsis (2008) 
Once awakened, the Hive, led by the ancient Alien Commander, led a strike force upon the teams of astronauts searching the mountain for energy crystals. There, the Battle of Olympus Mons began, with both Astros and Aliens taking heavy losses. An elite team of astronauts is sent into the hive to destroy it, and in the end, resulting in the destruction of the Hive. But the Alien Commander survives and retaliates by destroying the MX-81 Hypersonic Operations Aircraft.

Sets 

 7644 MX-81 Hypersonic Operations Aircraft

This set is the flagship of the astronauts. It comes with an Alien Spaceship, Mining Rover, and Alien Commander minifigure. It sold for US$89.99
 7645 MT-61 Crystal ReaperThe set has two scoopers that pick up crystals on the front and two saws to chunk up the ground for crystals. There is a mini experiment lab under the cockpit. There is a small alien ship included. This is one of the few sets with the Alien Commander. The set can also be modified with the Lego Power Functions expansion set, to use two motors, controlled by infrared remote control. It sold for US$59.99
 7646 ETX Alien InfiltratorThis set has an alien ship that can convert from an Alien Spaceship to a Land Walker. This set has a medium-sized robotic mining armoured suit. This is another set that has the Alien Commander. It sold for US$29.99
 7647 MX-41 Switch FighterThis set includes an Alien Gunship, and the human MX-41 Switch Fighter which can transform from a land vehicle to a fighter jet. It sold for US$19.99
 7648 MT-21 Mobile Mining UnitThis set comes with another mining unit, and an alien equipped with a jetpack. The mining unit has an attachment that holds devices to help mine crystals and has a small lab that has the results of an alien scan and a crystal. It sold for US$19.99
 7690 MB-01 Eagle Command BaseThis set includes the Eagle Command Base, a futuristic space shuttle, and an alien strike craft. The Eagle Command Base has an alien and a crystal examiner. It has a pump system to pump crystals and aliens round the base. There is also a defense station that has four air powered foam missiles and makes use of the pump system. The alien strike craft is equivalent to the strike fighter in the Crystallien Conflict game. It sold for US$79.99
 7691 ETX Alien Mothership AssaultThis set includes the Alien Mothership and a small mining station. The Alien Mothership can split into four different sections: two Vipers, one Dragon Cruiser (the front section), and the main hull. The main hull seems to be the "Experiment Lab" in the CrystAlien Conflict game. The defense station includes a small mining unit attached to a defense turret with foam darts like the one in the Eagle Command Base. It sold for US$49.99
 7692 'MX-71 Recon DropshipThis set includes the MX-71 Recon Dropship, a small mining unit, and the only upright alien attack craft. The Recon Dropship's design allows it to pick up the mining unit, carry it around, then drop it off again. The Recon Dropship's weapons include a missile launcher, twin laser cannons, and two homing rockets. The alien craft seats two aliens, and is armed with seven lasers it appears as the "Crystal Extractor" in the online game. In the Crystallien Conflict game, four of its cockpits make up the "Training Camp" It sold for US$39.99
 7693 ETX Alien StrikeThis set includes another alien strike craft and a small mining unit like the one with the Dropship, but instead containing a pod for captured aliens. The alien craft's wings can open into attack mode to show 15 lasers and deliver maximum firepower. On the CrystAlien Conflict game, the alien ship (in stealth mode) is the Hyper Carrier, equivalent to the Dropship. It sold for US$19.99
 7694 MT-31 TrikeThis set includes the heavy duty Trike, a vehicle that is a quick transport and deadly scout. It is armed with four lasers and carries an alien transport pod. The MT-31 Trike uses one energy crystal. It sold for US$11.99

 7695 MX-11 Astro FighterThis set includes the Astro Fighter and an unarmed helpless alien. The MX-11 Astro Fighter is armed with a single laser cannon, powered by a single energy crystal. It sold for US$9.99
 7697 MT-51 Claw-Tank AmbushThis set includes an alien speeder and the Claw-Tank. The Claw-Tank has an energy disk shooter that holds six energy disks. The two alien transport pods are positioned directly above the treads. The Claw-Tank's large cab can rotate a full 360 degrees. The alien speeder is a small, versatile craft that battles the Claw-Tank with its lasers. It sold for US$29.99

 7699 MT-101 Armored Drilling UnitThis massive machine rumbles across Martian terrain, searching for energy crystals. There is a small alien speeder with lasers, but the Mars Mission Team can fight back with an energy sphere launcher. The mining unit has two leach craft which can split off from the main unit if the main unit is attacked. It sold for US$69.99

 7649 MT-201 Ultra-Drill Walker 
This set features a giant LEGO Mars Mission vehicle which moves by means of its four robotic legs. It also features a large spinning laser drill mounted on the top of it. One astronaut controls this drill, while the second astronaut controls the bottom half of the vehicle. In addition, the spaceship located on the front of the vehicle can be detached to locate and transport energy crystals back to base. This set also features an alien vehicle piloted by the alien commander. It sold for US$79.99

 5616 Mini-RobotThis set has a mini mining robot and an astronaut, which it helps to find crystals using its crystal energy detector. When it finds some the astronaut will mine it with his pick-axe. The astronaut has a laser gun to defend him and the robot from aliens. It sold for US$6.99
 5617 Alien JetThis set comes with a small alien ship and an alien driver. It sold for US$6.99
 5619 Crystal HawkThis set comes with a small spaceship, along with the astronaut that drives it. It is a little smaller than the MX-11 Astro Fighter, but has two laser cannons mounted on the front. It sold for US$6.99

 Video games 
There have been a few Video Games based on Lego mars mission, such as:

Lego Battles
Lego Battles was a Nintendo DS video game heavily featuring sets and characters from Lego mars mission in the Space and Ailen stories.

Crystalien ConflictCrystalien Conflict was a real-time strategy web browser game based on the Mars Mission vehicles and sets.  The player could build and command either astronaut or alien units and structures through a short series of levels.  The game was playable on the official website until the discontinuation of the theme. A project named CrystAlien Redux Project''' aims to restore and improve the original game, which can be played at the project's website.

Units

Astronauts 

 Infantry - basic combat infantry unit
Engineer - infantry unit used to repair buildings and vehicles
Armored Mining Unit - resource-collecting unit from 7699 MT-101 Armored Drilling Unit
Trike - quick scout vehicle from 7694 MT-31 Trike
Astro Fighter - small, quick aerial fighter from 7695 MX-11 Astro Fighter
Jetpack Explorer - aerial infantry unit
Claw Tank Ambush - strong battle unit from 7697 MT-51 Claw-Tank Ambush
Recon Dropship - infantry transport unit from 7692 MX-71 Recon Dropship
Switch Fighter - transformable land and air fighter from 7647 MX-41 Switch Fighter
Crystal Reaper - battle unit from 7645 MT-61 Crystal Reaper

Aliens 

 Drone - basic combat infantry unit
 Saboteur - infantry unit used to repair buildings and vehicles
 Crystal Extractor - resource-collecting unit
 Speeder- quick scout unit
 Strike Fighter - small, quick aerial fighter
 Viper Attack - aerial infantry unit
 Dragon Cruiser - strong battle unit
 Hyper Carrier - infantry transport unit from 7693 ETX Alien Strike
 Alien Infiltrator - transformable land and air fighter from 7646 ETX Alien Infiltrator
 Alien Commander - strong infantry unit

Related books

References

External links 
 Mars Mission Home 
 Mars Mission Games 
 LEGO Mars Mission Wiki

Mars Mission
Products introduced in 2007
Products and services discontinued in 2009